Generally, uncharted territory is territory not found on nautical charts.  Uncharted Territory may refer to:

Uncharted Territory (novella), a 1994 science fiction novella by Connie Willis
Uncharted Territory (album), a 2011 album by Don Moen
Uncharted Territory, LLC, a film production company based in Los Angeles, California
Uncharted Territories, a term relating to the Australian-American science fiction television series Farscape
Uncharted Territory, a BBC television show presented by Juliet Morris
Uncharted Territory, an independent music radio show broadcast by WZAT radio station